The International Scouter Association was founded during a Scout conference in March 1947 in Mittenwald. The founders were German Scouts and Scouts-in-exile. The seat was in Munich.

See also

Boy Scouts of the United Nations
Scouting in displaced persons camps
Non-aligned Scouting and Scout-like organisations
World Friendship Fund

References

The Undaunted (English): Piet J. Kroonenberg book about Scouts in Central and Eastern Europe who kept the Scouting spirit alive despite oppression and persecution, over many decades, and revived the Scout Movement at the earliest opportunity. 200 emblems and badges, 420 pages.
The Undaunted II (English): Piet J. Kroonenberg-the continuation of Kroonenberg's first work, dealing with Albania, Estonia, Lithuania and Vietnam, 94 pages.

Non-aligned Scouting organizations
International Scouting
Exile organizations
Scouting and Guiding in Germany